Louisa Sara Galloway (born January 7, 1942) is a former volleyball player. She played for the United States national team at the 1964 Summer Olympics.

References

1942 births
Living people
Olympic volleyball players of the United States
Volleyball players at the 1964 Summer Olympics
Sportspeople from San Antonio
American women's volleyball players
21st-century American women